The 2014 Melbourne Storm season was the 17th in the club's history. They competed in the 2014 NRL season and were coached by Craig Bellamy and captained by Cameron Smith.  In 2014 the Storm did not achieve a good level of consistent success however won enough games late in the season to qualify for the NRL finals in 6th place. The club finished outside the top four for the first time since 2005 (other than when competition points were stripped in 2010). It was a roller coaster campaign that kicked off with consecutive one-point wins, courtesy of drop goals from Smith and Cooper Cronk. Storm five wins this season came at a combined 17 points. Injuries to Cronk (broken arm) and Billy Slater (shoulder) during the Origin period saw the Storm lose four of six games during that stretch as they were left clinging to 8th spot on the NRL ladder. The team managed to steady the ship by winning six of their last eight home-and-away games to finish sixth. In a significant boost for the Club, captain Cameron Smith signed a four-year contract extension just one week into the season.

Season summary 
Pre-season- New recruits took part in Melbourne Storm IDQ camp for pre season training before New Years. Matt Duffie was awarded the IDQ Iron bar with special recognition to both Justin O'Neill and Kenny Bromwich. 
 Auckland Nines - The club competed in the inaugural Auckland Nines tournament on the weekend of the 15th and 16 February. After losing two of three pool games they failed to progress to the finals of the tournament. Ryan Hoffman captained the squad.
 Round 1 - The Storm opened their season with a Golden Point extra time win over Manly Warringah. Cameron Smith kicked the winning field goal. Smith also equaled the Storm games record in the match. George Rose, Ben Roberts and Young Tonumaipea all made their debuts for the Storm. This also meant the Storm won their season opener for the 10th successive year.
 11 March - Cameron Smith officially announces that he has signed a four-year contract which will see him end his NRL career at the Storm.
 Round 2 - Cameron Smith played his 263rd game for the Storm breaking the club record held by Matt Geyer. Also, Billy Slater played his 250th Game for the Club and NRL.
 18 March - Jesse Bromwich commits to the Storm by signing a new four year playing contract.
 Round 5 - Dayne Weston makes his playing debut for the Storm.
 Round 6 - The Storm score a try after the siren to secure a 28 - 24 victory over the St George Illawarra Dragons. The Dragons with 13 minutes left on the clock, led 24-10.
 Round 8 - ANZAC Day In front of a record NRL crowd of 28,716 at AAMI Park the Storm go down to the New Zealand Warriors 16 - 10.
 Round 9 - Kurt Mann makes his debut for the Storm scoring the winning try in a 22-19 win over Manly.
 Round 10 - Craig Bellamy coached his 300th NRL game and Joel Romelo made his playing debut for the club. In addition when Cameron Smith, Billy Slater, Ryan Hoffman and Cooper Cronk ran out against South Sydney, it was the first time in NRL history four players of the same side had played a combined total of 1000 games.
 29 May - Both Kevin Proctor and Young Tonumaipea sign new playing contacts with the Storm.
 30 May - Cooper Cronk breaks his arm in the first State of Origin game ruling him out for 12 weeks. Billy Slater and Cameron Smith also suffered injuries in the game but Smith was able to follow up in the Round 12 game against North Queensland.
 Round 15 - Melbourne Storm returned to form with their biggest win of the season thus far (46-20) over the Parramatta Eels. Billy Slater also moved to equal third on the all time NRL try scorers list with Andrew Ettinghausen.
 Late June - The Storm sign Fijian Marika Koroibete from the West Tigers just before the June 30 deadline, he is one of the fastest players in the NRL and made his impact straight away scoring tries in the Storm's wins over Canberra and Brisbane. This followed the news that Sisa Waqa would depart for Canberra and the end of the season and Mitch Garbutt would depart for Brisbane.
 Rounds 19 and 20 - The Storm return to the winners list with wins over Canberra and Brisbane.
 Round 22 - Newcastle score two converted tries in the final 3 minutes of the game to snatch victory 32-30. Sisa Waqa scores a Storm season record of 4 tries in the game, he also equals the club record for most tries in a game.
 Round 25 - Cooper Cronk plays his 250th NRL game.
 Round 26 - The Storm defeat the Brisbane Broncos ensuring they qualify for the 2014 NRL Finals Series. 
 Finals Week 1 - Following the conclusion of Round 26, the Storm finished in 6th place meaning they were drawn against the Canterbury Bulldogs in an Elimination Final in Week 1 of the Finals Series the Storm's higher placing than Canterbury ensured it was played at home. The Storm ultimately lost the Elimination Final 28-4 ending their season. Ryan Hoffman also played his final game with the Storm.

Milestone games

Fixtures

Preseason 
(GP) - Bonus point try

Regular season

Finals Series 

Source Melbournestorm.com.au:

Ladder

2014 Coaches
 Craig Bellamy -Head Coach
 Justin Morgan -Assistant Coach
 Anthony Seibold -Assistant Coach
 Nathan Brown -Coaching Consultant 
 Brett Finch -Halves Coach
 Matt Adamson -U/20s Coach
 Tony Ayoub -Head Physiotherapist

2014 Squad
As of 26 July 2014

2014 Player movements

Source NRL.com:

Losses

Gareth Widdop to St. George Illawarra Dragons
Maurice Blair to Gold Coast Titans
Jason Ryles to Retirement
Brett Finch to Retirement
Junior Sa'u to Salford Red Devils
Lagi Setu to Canberra Raiders
Kirisome Auva'a to South Sydney Rabbitohs
Matt McGahan to Rugby Union
Denny Solomona to London Broncos
Siosaia Vave to Cronulla Sharks

Gains

George Rose from Manly Sea Eagles
Travis Robinson from Penrith Panthers
Cody Walker from Easts Tigers
Hymel Hunt from Gold Coast Titans
Felise Kaufusi from North Queensland Cowboys
Cameron Munster from Central Queensland Capras
Dayne Weston from Penrith Panthers
Ben Roberts from Parramatta Eels
Joel Romelo from Canterbury-Bankstown Bulldogs
Marika Koroibete from Wests Tigers

Representative honours
The following players have played a representative match in 2014. (C) = Captain

Statistics 
Statistics Source:

Most Points in a Game: 16
 Sisa Waqa vs Newcastle (Rd 22)

Most tries in a Game: 4
 Sisa Waqa vs Newcastle (Rd 22)

Highest score in a game: 48 points
 vs Cronulla (Rd 23)

Greatest winning margin: 42 points
 vs Cronulla (Rd 23)

Jersey
For the 2015 season, the Storm have released a new home jersey, once again made by BLK. The 2015 jersey no longer features the "lightning bolt V", instead featuring a large navy blue panel which highlights the crown resorts logo and purple shoulders. A silver horizontal strip also features across the chest. A new away jersey is also set to be released in December.

Awards

Melbourne Storm Awards Night
Held at Peninsula Docklands on Friday 10 October.

 Melbourne Storm Player of the Year: Jesse Bromwich
 Melbourne Storm Rookie of the Year: Kurt Mann
 Suzuki Members' Player of Year: Cooper Cronk
 Melbourne Storm Most Improved: Jordan McLean
 Melbourne Storm Best Forward: Cameron Smith
 Melbourne Storm Best Back: Cooper Cronk
 Best Try: Young Tonumaipea, Round 6 vs Dragons
 Darren Bell U20s Player of Year: Nelson Asofa-Solomona
 U20s Best Forward: Joe Stimson
 U20s Best Back: Charnze Nicoll-Klokstad
 Greg Brentnall Young Achievers Award: Charnze Nicoll-Klokstad
 Mick Moore Club Person of the Year: Craig Sultana (Head Trainer)

Rugby League Players Association Awards Night
 RLPA NYC Education Player of the Year: Christian Welch
 RLPA Education & Welfare Club of the Year: Peter Robinson, Brian Phelan & Andrew Blowers.

Additional Awards
 I Don't Quit Iron Bar: Matt Duffie
Harry Sunderland Medal: Cameron Smith

References

Melbourne Storm seasons
Melbourne Storm season